Walter Coppins (29 May 1902 – 11 December 1981) was an Australian cyclist. He competed in two events at the 1924 Summer Olympics.

References

External links
 

1902 births
1981 deaths
Australian male cyclists
Olympic cyclists of Australia
Cyclists at the 1924 Summer Olympics
Place of birth missing